AB Thulinverken was a company in Landskrona, Sweden, founded in 1914 as Enoch Thulins Aeroplanfabrik by the airman and aircraft technician Enoch Thulin. The company became Sweden's first aircraft manufacturer. In 1920, Thulin also started manufacturing automobiles, which continued until 1928. During World War I, the company came into financial difficulties and was reconstructed in 1922 as AB Thulinverken. The manufacturing of brake systems became a main focus of the company. In 1958, Thulinverken merged with Svenska AB Bromsregulator (founded in 1913). The remains of Thulinverken are now a part of SAB Wabco AB, which is owned by the French Faiveley Transport company since 2004.

Products

Aircraft

Aircraft Engines 
 Thulin A (air-cooled, 9-cylinder, 80 hp Le Rhône 9C rotary engine, bore x stroke 105 mm x 140 mm)
 Thulin D (possibly a double-row 9C)
 Thulin E (possibly the water-cooled, 6-cylinder 150 hp Benz Bz.III. Also manufactured by Scania-Vabis.
 Thulin G  (air-cooled, 11-cylinder, 100 hp Le Rhône 11F rotary, bore x stroke 105 mm x 140 mm)

Automobiles 
 Thulin A
 Thulin B

Motorcycles 
 Thulin MC I
 Thulin MC II
 Thulin MC II

References 
Notes

Sources

External links 

Flygplanshistoria i Landskrona 1909–1920
Bilhistoria i Landskrona 1919–1940

Aircraft manufacturers of Sweden
Defunct motor vehicle manufacturers of Sweden
Companies based in Landskrona